The 50 cc class was the ultra-lightweight class in Grand Prix motorcycle racing, and formed part of the Fédération Internationale de Motocyclisme (FIM) World Championships from 1962 until 1983; when the class was replaced by 80 cc.

History and development of the class
The relative low cost and increasing availability of 50 cc motorcycles in the post-war period, spawned a number of club road racing events for this size of machine in the early 1950s. With the earliest events being held in Italy and in the UK. The potential of this class for providing entertaining but affordable racing was soon recognised with several national championships and in 1961 the FIM introduced The Coupe d' Europe, a series of international events for 50 cc machines, each with a minimum duration and run to established Grand Prix rules and regulations. The series attracted a variety of entries, but the dominating force were the work's Kreidler team bikes. Based on a standard Kreidler Florett road bike, their single cylinder Kreidler Renn-Florett's featured lightweight frames, a special cylinder head and barrel, twin 16 mm Bing carburettors feeding the engine through rotary valves and improved suspension and brakes. By the end of the season, with the addition of rudimentary streamlining and the increase of carburettor size to 17 mm, the  four-speed two-stroke bikes could top over 85 mph.

The 1961 Coupe d’Europe

World Championship Status

See 1962 Season, 1963 Season, 1964 Season, 1965 Season, 1966 Season, 1967 Season

In 1962, the FIM followed up the success of the Coupe d’ Europe by giving the 50 cc class World Championship status. As well as the works entries of existing European manufacturers like Kreidler and Tomos, this development also attracted entries from Japanese manufacturers with both Honda and Suzuki entering full work's teams. The Spanish Derbi factory also entered a single work's bike for the Spanish Grand Prix.

The Kreidlers were now fitted with three speed overdrives controlled from the twistgrip, which coupled to the standard four-speed gearbox gave twelve gears to help keep the engines at maximum power. The Kreidlers development would be hampered however by the factory's insistence that the race bikes remained fundamentally based upon their standard road machines. Suzuki and Honda knew no such limitations.

Honda's commitment to four-stroke engines dated back to 1951 with the launch of its Dream E-Type

prior to this all Honda's bikes were two-strokes. The change and long-term commitment to the more sophisticated four-stroke technology came either directly from founder Soichiro Honda or indirectly due to pressure from managing director Takeo Fujisawa, who was said to be appalled by the noise and smoke that two-stroke engines produced and the additional hassle that Honda customers faced by having to mix oil with their fuel. 
Honda began their first 50 cc GP season with the RC110, announced at the Japanese Motor Show in 1961. It was introduced with a five-speed gearbox, but by the time of the opening GP in Spain, the bikes were upgraded to six gears. Even so, they were badly outperformed. Rider Tommy Robb suggested that more gears might be the answer and was amazed to find a week later at the French GP that the gearbox had been expanded to eight speeds. This still wasn't enough to compensate for the machine's relative lack of power and three weeks later at the Isle of Man TT, nine gears were fitted and the rev limit increased to 17,000 rpm with output now up to around 10 hp. In that season, the machine's designation was changed to RC111, but Honda's records are unclear as to what precise change in the development this signified or when it was used.

Ernst Degner who had defected from the East German MZ team to Suzuki the previous year, brought with him the secrets of MZ's two-stroke tuning success which undoubtedly helped him and the Suzuki team to secure the inaugural 50 cc World Championship.

The Japanese withdraw
After the withdrawal of Japanese firms from the 50 cc category at the end of 1968, cost-saving technological restrictions were introduced, the Spanish rider Angel Nieto came to the fore, and between 1969 and 1976, won the championship six times. His season long battle for the 1972 championship with Dutchman Jan de Vries, being perhaps the closest fought championship in any form of motor racing. By the end of the season both riders were tied with equal points, an equal number of wins and an equal number of second-place finishes and the championship winner was determined by adding together and comparing the times for the six races in which the pair had been placed. Nieto was calculated to have won the title by 21½ seconds from his rival.

50 cc GP World Champions

References

Grand Prix motorcycle racing